Paul Vincent Galvin (June 29, 1895 – November 5, 1959) was an American chief executive, who was one of the two founders of telecommunications company Motorola. Founded as Galvin Manufacturing Corporation on September 25, 1928, Motorola became a leader in communications equipment. Galvin created the mass production car radio, which provided the cornerstone of Motorola's early business. The company name "Motorola" was introduced in 1930.

Biography
Galvin was born in Harvard, Illinois. He served as an artillery officer during World War I. Later, Galvin attended Illinois Institute of Technology. During college, Galvin was an active member of the Phi Kappa Theta fraternity. He lived briefly in Marshfield, Wisconsin. In 1942, his wife Lillian was murdered in their home in Evanston, Illinois, a murder which was never solved.

Six sigma was developed at Motorola under the leadership of his son, Bob Galvin.

Other
The school library on the Illinois Institute of Technology's main campus is named after Galvin.

The biology building at the University of Notre Dame is called Galvin Hall, named after Paul Galvin.

The Paul V. Galvin Playhouse at Arizona State University is named for Paul Galvin. With its continental seating and a capacity of 485 seats, the Galvin, a proscenium theater, hosts many events and performances every year, including dance concerts, theatre production, welcome and convocation events, film screenings and more.

See also
Battery eliminator

External links 
 Paul Galvin at the Automotive Hall of Fame
 

 
 

Motorola employees
American chief executives
1895 births
1959 deaths
People from Harvard, Illinois
People from Marshfield, Wisconsin
American military personnel of World War I
Illinois Institute of Technology alumni
American automotive pioneers
20th-century American businesspeople